John McCarty (July 13, 1844... in Westchester County, New York – October 20, 1905 in Goshen, Orange County, New York) was an American politician from New York.

Life 
John was born on July 13, 1844 in Westchester County, New York. He was the son of Hugh McCarty and Sarah Rogers, Irish immigrants from County Down. Hugh was a contractor for masonry who owned his own quarries and provided stone for the High Bridge and the Brooklyn Naval Yard dry dock. In about 1863 John joined his father in Brooklyn, where Hugh initially planned on setting up his son to work as a grocery store owner.

Instead, John worked in the Naval Yard and became politically active in the Brooklyn 5th Ward. He served for several years as the Brooklyn Board of Health's chief clerk, followed a position as Justice Walsh's clerk. In 1878, he was elected to the Brooklyn Board of Alderman, where he served until 1891 and at different points was made president of the board. For many years he was one of the "Big Four" who controlled the Brooklyn Democratic Party, the other three being Hugh McLaughlin, James Shevlin, and Patrick H. McCarren.

In 1891 he was elected to the New York State Senate, where he represented the 2nd District in 1892 and 1893. He was elected to the newly drawn 6th District in the 1893 election, but accusations of voter fraud in Gravesend and Staten Island led Republican  Henry Wolfert to be seated in the State Senate instead.

After he left the State Senate, he moved to Goshen, where he lived for the rest of his life. He had racing horse stables there, and among his horses was Joe Patchen.

He married Margaret O'Neil in the Church of the Assumption near the end of the Civil War. They had no surviving children. In 1904, it was revealed that he had a second wife, Mary Eloise Lynch, who was living in Pittsfield. Mary was Margaret's niece and the mother of John's three sons: John Jr., William, and Arthur.

John died on October 20, 1905 of pneumonia in his home in Goshen. He was buried in Holy Cross Cemetery.

References 

He Will Be a Senator in The Brooklyn Daily Eagle on October 25, 1891.
The New York Red Book. United States, Williams Press, 1892. pp. 88–89.
M'Carty Named in The Brooklyn Citizen on October 12, 1893.
McCarty Will be Unseated in The Brooklyn Daily Eagle on January 29, 1894.
"Niece" of Mrs. McCarty Figures in an Old Story in The Brooklyn Eagle on November 4, 1904.
John McCarty is Dead At His Home In Goshen in The Brooklyn Daily Eagle on October 20, 1905.
The History of Orange County, New York. United States, Van Deusen and Elms, 1908. pp. 885–886.
The Political Graveyard

1844 births
1905 deaths
Democratic Party New York (state) state senators
People from Goshen, New York
Politicians from Brooklyn
American people of Northern Ireland descent
19th-century American politicians
Burials at Holy Cross Cemetery, Brooklyn